Tứ Kỳ is a township and capital of Tứ Kỳ District, Hải Dương Province, Vietnam.

References

Populated places in Hải Dương province
District capitals in Vietnam
Townships in Vietnam